In group theory, a discipline within abstract algebra, a special group is a finite group of prime power order that is either elementary abelian itself or of class 2 with its derived group, its center, and its Frattini subgroup all equal and elementary abelian .  A special group of order pn that has class 2 and whose derived group has order p is called an extra special group.

References

Finite groups
P-groups